The Jabiru J160 is an Australian ultralight trainer, designed and produced by Jabiru Aircraft of Bundaberg, Queensland. Certified in the Australian primary aircraft category, the aircraft is supplied complete and ready-to-fly.

Design and development
The J160 features a strut-braced high-wing, an enclosed cabin with two-seats-in-side-by-side configuration accessed by doors, fixed tricycle landing gear and a single engine in tractor configuration.

The aircraft is made from composite materials. The standard engine available is the  Jabiru 2200 four-stroke powerplant.

The design was developed into the Jabiru J170, by adding the wing from the Jabiru J430, for the light-sport aircraft category.

Variants

J160-C
Early model
J160-D
Certified version

Specifications (J160)

References

External links

J160
2000s Australian civil trainer aircraft
Single-engined tractor aircraft